Vestamager most often refers to Kalvebod Fælled, but is also the name of one of the 15 administrative, statistical, and tax city districts (bydele) comprising the municipality of Copenhagen, Denmark.  It lies on the south border of the municipality on the island of Amager.  It covers an area of 13.99 km², has a population of 7,799 and a population density of 558 per km², making it both the largest district in area and the least densely populated district in Copenhagen.

Neighboring city districts are as follows:
 to the east is Sundbyvester
 to the north is Christianshavn, separated from Sundbyvester by Stadsgraven
 to the south is the part of Kalvebod Fælled that lies in Tårnby municipality

See also 
 Vestamager station

External links 
 City of Copenhagen’s statistical office

Copenhagen city districts